Ilha de Boipeba is an island in the Cairu municipality in Brazil, near the Ilha de Tinharé and part of the Cairu Archipelago. It is surrounded on the east by the Atlantic Ocean and on the west by the Rio de l'Enfer estuary.

It is a popular tourist destination due to its scenic beaches and rainforest, which makes up the majority of the island's economy along with fishing.

The island covers 88 square kilometers and had a population of 3,256 in 2010. There are four villages: Velha Boipeba, São Sebastião, Moreré, and Monte Alegre. Its beaches are Praia da Boca da Barra, Praia de Tassimirim, Praia da Cueira, Praia de Moreré, Praia de Bainema, Praia da Cova da Onça, and Praia da Ponta dos Castelhanos.

Ilha de Boipeba was first settled in 1537 by Jesuits from Portugal, making it one of the oldest settled places in the state of Bahia. The Church of Divino Espírito Santo, built in 1610, is its most important monument.

The name Boipeba comes from the word "M'boi pewa" (literally "flat snake") in the Tupi language, the native name for the sea turtle.

See also
List of islands of Brazil

References

External links

Atlantic islands of Brazil
Landforms of Bahia